Netherlands competed at the 2015 World Championships in Athletics in Beijing, China, from 22–30 August 2015.

At the third day Dafne Schippers won in a new Dutch national record her semi final heat of the 100 metres in a time of 10.83. With this achievement she became the first Dutch finalist in the women's 100 metres at a World Championships. In the final, later that day, she broke her national record again with a time of 10.81 and won the silver medal. Later, she won the gold medal in the 200 metres in a time of 21.63, a new European record.

Medalists

Results
(q – qualified, NM – no mark, SB – season best)

Men
Track and road events

Field events

Combined events – Decathlon

Women 
Track and road events

Field events

Combined events – Heptathlon

References

Sources 

Nations at the 2015 World Championships in Athletics
World Championships in Athletics
Netherlands at the World Championships in Athletics